The 2009 NCAA Division I baseball tournament was held from May 29 through June 24, 2009 and is part of the 2009 NCAA Division I baseball season. The 64 NCAA Division I college baseball teams were selected out of an eligible 286 teams on May 25, 2009. Thirty teams were awarded an automatic bid as champions of their conference, and 34 teams were selected at-large by the NCAA Division I Baseball Committee.

The 2009 tournament culminated with 8 teams advancing to the College World Series at historic Rosenblatt Stadium in Omaha, Nebraska, beginning on June 13.

Bids

Automatic bids 
Conference champions from 30 Division I conferences earned automatic bids to regionals. The remaining 34 spots were awarded to schools as at-large invitees.

Bids by conference

National seeds
Bold indicates CWS participant.
 Texas (41-13-1)
  (42–14)
 LSU (46–16)
 North Carolina (42–16)
 Arizona State (44–12)
 UC Irvine (43–13)
  (41–18)
 Florida (39–20)

Regionals and super regionals

Regional schedule
Regional rounds were held Friday, May 29 through Monday, June 1. Each regional followed a double elimination format, with 2 games each played on Friday, Saturday, and Sunday, and one on Monday when needed.

Super Regional Schedule
Best-of-three super regionals were held Friday, June 5 through Monday, June 8. Four series were played Friday-Sunday and four series were played Saturday-Monday with the final day in each grouping if necessary.

Brackets
Bold indicates winner. * indicates extra innings.

Austin Super Regional
Hosted by Texas at UFCU Disch–Falk Field

Gainesville Super Regional
Hosted by Florida at Alfred A. McKethan Stadium

Tempe Super Regional
Hosted by Arizona State at Packard Stadium

Chapel Hill Super Regional
Hosted by North Carolina at Boshamer Stadium

Fullerton Super Regional
Hosted by Cal State Fullerton at Goodwin Field

Tallahassee Super Regional
Hosted by Florida State at Dick Howser Stadium

Oxford Super Regional
Hosted by Ole Miss at Swayze Field

Baton Rouge Super Regional
Hosted by LSU at Alex Box Stadium

College World Series

Participants

Bracket

Championship series

Game 1

Game 2

Game 3

All-Tournament Team

The following players were members of the College World Series All-Tournament Team.

Record by conference

The columns RF, SR, WS, NS, CS, and NC respectively stand for the regional finals, super regionals, College World Series, national semifinals, championship series, and national champion.

Tournament notes

Round 1
All 16 No. 1 seeds won their first-round games for the second time since the tournament expanded to 64 teams in 1999; thus no No. 4 was able to win their first-round game.
Seven No. 3 seeds won their first-round games in upsets.

Round 2
Fresno State, the champions of the 2008 NCAA College World Series, was eliminated in the Irvine Regional after losing to UC Irvine and San Diego State.
Texas defeated Boston College 3–2 in 25 innings, which broke the record of the longest game in NCAA baseball history lasting more than seven hours.
Two National-seeds lost in round two: #6 UC Irvine and #7 Oklahoma.
Four No. 2 seeds advanced to the Regional finals with a 2–0 record.
Three No. 2 seeds (Alabama, Georgia Southern and Texas State) were eliminated from the tournament after going 0–2.
Two No. 3 seeds (Southern Miss and Oklahoma State) advanced to the Regional finals with a 2–0 record.
Five No. 4 seeds registered a win in their opening game in the losers bracket.

Regional finals
Florida State sets NCAA postseason records with 37 runs, 38 hits and 66 total bases in a blowout win over Ohio State, 37–6.
Two No. 4 seeds advanced to the Regional finals: Army and Utah.
Two National-seeds failed to advance to the Super regionals: #6 UC Irvine and #7 Oklahoma.
The only non-No. 1 seeds to advance to the Super regionals were Arkansas, Southern Miss, and Virginia.
No team which lost its opening round game was able to come back and win its Regional. Vanderbilt, the No. 3 seed in the Louisville Regional, was the only team to lose its opener and come back to force a decisive second game in the regional final. The Commodores lost to No. 2 seed Middle Tennessee in the opening round before winning three consecutive elimination games against No. 4 seed Indiana, a rematch with MT and host Louisville before falling to the Cardinals the next night.

Super regionals
No. 2 seed Arkansas, No. 2 seed Virginia, and No. 3 seed Southern Miss became the ninth, tenth, and eleventh teams respectively in NCAA history to advance to the College World Series without playing a game at their home park. 
Arkansas became the third team since the tournament expanded in 1999 to reach the CWS by going undefeated (5–0) on the road in both Regionals and Super regionals, joining Southern California in 2000 and UC Irvine in 2007.
No. 2 seed Virginia advanced to the first College World Series in school history by winning the Oxford Super Regional 2–1.
No. 3 seed Southern Miss advanced to the first College World Series in school history by winning the Gainesville Super Regional 2–0.
Three of the 8 national seeds failed to make it to the CWS.

College World Series
2009 was the 17th consecutive year the SEC fielded a team in the CWS.
Both Virginia and Southern Miss played in their first College World Series in school history.
Only two teams from the 2008 CWS, LSU and North Carolina, returned for 2009.
2009 marked the first time in six seasons that a top-eight national seed won the title.
LSU played for the championship for the first time since 2000, and it was the first time LSU has appeared in the best of 3 championship series.

CWS records broken
 All-time hits by a player: 28 by Dustin Ackley of UNC, broken against Southern Miss in game 7
 Pitchers used in a single game by one team (tied): 8 by Arkansas in game 11
 Pitchers used in a single game by both teams (tied): 13 by LSU and Arkansas in game 11
 Career games played: 21 by Garrett Gore of North Carolina, broken against Arizona St. in game 10
 Most wild pitches in a single-game: 4 by Matt Harvey of North Carolina, broken against Arizona St. in game 10
 Home runs in a College World Series: 4 by Russell Moldenhauer of Texas, tied the record against LSU in game 2 of the finals.
 Attendance Record: 336,076, previous record set in 2008 of 330,099
 Combined home runs in the Championship Finals: 12, previous record of 9 set in 2008.

Television/radio/online coverage

Regionals
 ESPNU broadcast every game from both the Tallahassee and Irvine Regionals.
 Comcast/Charter Sports Southeast broadcast every game from the Clemson Regional.
 Cox Sports (Louisiana) broadcast every game from the Baton Rouge Regional.
 Sun Sports broadcast selected games from the Gainesville Regional.

Super regionals
All super-regional games were shown on ESPN, ESPN2 or ESPNU on television and ESPN360 through online streaming video.

College World Series
All College World Series games were shown on ESPN, ESPN2 or ESPNU on television and ESPN360 through online streaming video.

References

External links
Schedule, results, and game times at ESPN

NCAA Division I Baseball Championship
 
Baseball in Austin, Texas
Baseball in Houston
Baseball in the Dallas–Fort Worth metroplex